Dharwad Lok Sabha constituency  is one of the 28 Lok Sabha (lower house of Indian parliament) constituencies in Karnataka, a state in southern India. This constituency was created as a part of the delimitation of the parliamentary constituencies in 2008, based on the recommendations of the Delimitation Commission of India constituted in 2002. It first held elections in 2009 and its first member of parliament was Pralhad Joshi of the Bharatiya Janata Party (BJP). After winning 2019 general elections Pralhad Joshi was appointed as Minister of Parliamentary Affairs, Minister of Coal, Minister of Mining on 30 May 2019 in cabinet headed by Prime Minister Narendra Modi.

Assembly segments
As of 2014, Dharwad Lok Sabha constituency comprises the following eight Vidhan Sabha (legislative assembly) segments:
Before delimitation, Navalgund, Dharwad and Kalghatgi Legislative Assembly segments were part of the former Dharwad North constituency and Kundgol and Shiggaon Legislative Assembly segments were part of the former Dharwad South constituency.

Members of Parliament

Election results

General election 2019

General election 2014

General election 2009

See also
 Dharwad North Lok Sabha constituency
 Dharwad South Lok Sabha constituency
 Dharwad district
 List of Constituencies of the Lok Sabha

References

Lok Sabha constituencies in Karnataka
Dharwad district
Hubli–Dharwad